Artak Ludviki Davtyan (30 October 1966 – 6 March 2023) was an Armenian economist and politician. A member of the Republican Party of Armenia, he served in the National Assembly from 2007 to 2017.

Davtyan died on 6 March 2023, at the age of 56.

References

1966 births
2023 deaths
Armenian economists
Republican Party of Armenia politicians
Armenian State University of Economics alumni
Members of the National Assembly (Armenia)
People from Syunik Province